Québec-Ouest may refer to:
 Quebec West, a former federal electoral district in the area of Quebec City
 Québec-Ouest (provincial electoral district), a former provincial electoral district in the area of Quebec City